Max Josef Metzger (3 February 1887 – 17 April 1944) was a Catholic priest and leading German pacifist who was executed by the Nazis during World War II.

Life
Born on 3 February 1887, in Schopfheim in Baden, Germany, Metzger studied first at the lycee in Konstanz, where Martin Heidegger was also a student. Here Metzger gave a lecture on the "History of the Monastery at Reichenau". As a student, Metzger likely lived at Saint Conrad, a student residence established by the archbishop of Freiburg to provide religious training for those preparing for Holy Orders. One of the highly regarded professors at the lycee was an instructor by the name of Pacius, a democrat and pacifist who taught modern languages.

Metzger then attended the University of Freiburg and then at the University of Fribourg in Switzerland, where he earned a doctorate in theology. In 1911 he was ordained a Roman Catholic priest for the Diocese of Fribourg, and undertook parish work. He served as a military chaplain for the forces of Imperial Germany during World War I. Father Metzger was awarded the Iron Cross on 6 May 1915, and subsequently honorably discharged because of ill health. His experience on the front lines convinced him that "future wars have lost their meaning, since they no longer give anybody the prospect of winning more than he loses".

Pacificism and Esperanto
In 1916 Metzger published Frieden auf Erden (Peace on Earth), a pamphlet urging an end to war. He moved to Graz, Austria where he became secretary to the Catholic League of the Cross of Austria, an organization involved in educating people about the dangers of alcoholism. In 1918 he established the secular institute, the Mission Society of the White Cross.

Metzger was also involved in establishing the German Catholics’ Peace Association which used Esperanto in its international contacts from 1918. In 1920 Metzger founded "Internacio Katolika" (IKA). From 1921 to 1924 Metzger edited the Esperanto magazine, Katolika Mondo (Catholic World), in Graz.

In 1920 met with Pope Benedict XV, who encouraged him to work for disarmament in Europe. Strongly advocating the ecumenical idea of peace he soon became known as a leading German pacifist and Esperantist.

In 1926 he re-located to Meiningen, where he and his community (now known as the Society of Christ the King) had been invited to staff and manage the Catholic Charities facility.

In 1938, Metzger founded the "Una Sancta Brotherhood" a group devoted to the re-unification of the Lutheran and Catholic churches.

After the rise to power of German dictator Adolf Hitler in 1933, Metzger was arrested several times by the Gestapo. In 1943, Metzger wrote a memorandum on the reorganization of the German state and its integration into a future system of world peace. When he tried to have this memorandum delivered to the Swedish Archbishop of Uppsala, Erling Eidem, Metzger was denounced by the courier. Metzger's memorandum never reached Uppsala. The courier was a female Gestapo agent, Swedish-born Dagmar Imgart, and Metzger was arrested on 29 June 1943.

Metzger was tried by the German People's Court. The Judge-President of the court, Roland Freisler, said that people like Metzger should be "eradicated."  Metzger was sentenced to death and he was executed on 17 April 1944 in Brandenburg-Görden Prison.

Legacy
Thomas Merton was once influenced by the life of Max Josef Metzger. In his essay "A Martyr for Peace and Unity", he cites Metzger's example in dying for peace. In protesting Hitler's abuse of power, Metzger wrote that, "it is honorable to die for one's country, but still more honorable to die for righteousness and peace."

The Catholic Church regards Max Josef Metzger as a martyr of faith.

There is a Max-Josef-Metzger-Platz in Berlin, and some text in Esperanto.

See also
Catholic Church and Nazi Germany
Kirchenkampf
Jojo Rabbit (film)

References

Further reading
 Swidler, Leonard (1977). Bloodwitness for peace and unity. The life of Max Josef Metzger. Ecumenical Press, Philadelphia, OCLC 
 Stevenson, Lilian (1952). Max Joseph Metzger, priest and martyr, 1887–1944, with a selection from his letters and poems written in prison. SPCK, London, OCLC .

1887 births
1944 deaths
German military chaplains
People from Baden-Württemberg executed by Nazi Germany
World War I chaplains
Recipients of the Iron Cross (1914)
People from Lörrach (district)
Catholic resistance to Nazi Germany
Roman Catholics in the German Resistance
People from the Grand Duchy of Baden
20th-century German Roman Catholic priests